"Oh! Darling" is a song by the English rock band the Beatles, appearing as the fourth song on the 1969 album Abbey Road. It was composed by Paul McCartney (credited to Lennon–McCartney). Its working title was "Oh! Darling (I'll Never Do You No Harm)". Although not issued as a single in either the United Kingdom or the United States, a regional subsidiary of Capitol successfully edited it as a single in Central America, having "Maxwell's Silver Hammer" as its B-side. It was also issued as a single in Portugal.  Apple Records released "Oh! Darling" in Japan with "Here Comes the Sun" in June 1970.

Background
McCartney later said of recording the track, "When we were recording 'Oh! Darling' I came into the studios early every day for a week to sing it by myself because at first my voice was too clear. I wanted it to sound as though I'd been performing it on stage all week." He would only try the song once each day; if it was not right he would wait until the next day. According to sound engineer Alan Parsons, McCartney once lamented that "five years ago I could have done this in a flash".
In a 1980 interview with Playboy magazine, John Lennon said, "'Oh! Darling' was a great one of Paul's that he didn't sing too well. I always thought I could have done it better – it was more my style than his. He wrote it, so what the hell, he's going to sing it." The song is in the key of A major.

George Harrison described the song as "a typical 1950s–'60s-period song because of its chord structure".

Recordings
The basic track was recorded on 20 April 1969. There were many overdub sessions, including McCartney's attempts at the lead vocal. According to Ian MacDonald, the backing vocals were "exquisite", but "sadly underplayed in the mix". Engineer Geoff Emerick recalled that McCartney sang while the backing track played over speakers, instead of headphones, because he wanted to feel as though he was singing to a live audience. The song has been performed live by Paul McCartney and The Pretenders' Chrissie Hynde during a memorial concert for Foo Fighters drummer Taylor Hawkins on 3 September 2022.

Get Back sessions
McCartney first recorded a demo of "Oh! Darling" at Twickenham Studios on 16 January 1969 during the Get Back sessions without the other Beatles being present, as the Twickenham set they had been using was being dismantled due to their moving the sessions to Apple Corps' headquarters. After an early attempt at the song by the band on 27 January 1969, Lennon announced, "Just heard that Yoko's divorce has just gone through", after which he and the band burst into an improvised version of the song, substituting "I'm free at last" for a part of the lyric. The song and the following improvisation are included on the Anthology 3 CD. This version also features a keyboard part played by Billy Preston.

Style
"Oh! Darling" is a rhythm and blues song incorporating elements of doo-wop and the New Orleans rhythm and blues sound popularised during the 1950s and early 1960s by musicians such as Fats Domino; it also seems to have drawn on the Louisiana swamp blues sound found in songs like Slim Harpo's "Rainin' in My Heart" and Charles Brown's "Please Come Home for Christmas". Furthermore, it may have drawn on the related Louisiana genre known today as swamp pop, whose distinctive sound bears an uncanny resemblance to the basic structure of "Oh! Darling" – so much so that some in Louisiana originally thought the song had been recorded by a local musician. (When swamp pop musician John Fred met the Beatles in London in the 1960s, he was shocked to learn that "they were very familiar with Louisiana music.") Fittingly, swamp pop musician Jay Randall eventually covered "Oh! Darling" for the Lanor label of Church Point, Louisiana.

Personnel
According to Ian MacDonald:

 Paul McCartney – lead and backing vocals, bass 
 John Lennon – backing vocals, piano
 George Harrison – backing vocals, electric guitar
 Ringo Starr – drums

However, the book accompanying the 2019 box set Abbey Road: Super Deluxe Version lists an alternative line-up:

 Paul McCartney – lead and backing vocals, piano
 John Lennon – backing vocals, guitar
 George Harrison – backing vocals, bass
 Ringo Starr – drums

Robin Gibb, Bee Gees version

In 1978, "Oh! Darling" was released on the Sgt. Pepper's Lonely Hearts Club Band soundtrack. It was also released as Robin Gibb's fourth solo single. It reached number 15 on the Billboard pop chart and number 22 in the US Adult Contemporary Charts on 7 October 1978. It was Gibb's highest charting single in the United States.

Chart performance

References

Sources

External links

 

 "Oh Darling": The Story behind the song (udiscover music|

The Beatles songs
1969 songs
Song recordings produced by George Martin
Songs written by Lennon–McCartney
Robin Gibb songs
Songs published by Northern Songs
1970 singles
1978 singles
Apple Records singles
RSO Records singles
British hard rock songs
British rock-and-roll songs
Swamp pop music